This is a list of films produced in Canada ordered by year and date of release. At present, films predating 1920 are directly listed here; from 1920 on, links are provided to standalone lists by decade or year.

1890s

1900s

1910s

1920s
List of Canadian films of the 1920s

1930s
List of Canadian films of the 1930s

1940s
List of Canadian films of the 1940s

1950s
List of Canadian films of the 1950s

1960s
List of Canadian films of the 1960s

1970s
List of Canadian films of 1970
List of Canadian films of 1971
List of Canadian films of 1972
List of Canadian films of 1973
List of Canadian films of 1974
List of Canadian films of 1975
List of Canadian films of 1976
List of Canadian films of 1977
List of Canadian films of 1978
List of Canadian films of 1979

1980s
 List of Canadian films of 1980
 List of Canadian films of 1981
 List of Canadian films of 1982
 List of Canadian films of 1983
 List of Canadian films of 1984
 List of Canadian films of 1985
 List of Canadian films of 1986
 List of Canadian films of 1987
 List of Canadian films of 1988
 List of Canadian films of 1989

1990s
 List of Canadian films of 1990
 List of Canadian films of 1991
 List of Canadian films of 1992
 List of Canadian films of 1993
 List of Canadian films of 1994
 List of Canadian films of 1995
 List of Canadian films of 1996
 List of Canadian films of 1997
 List of Canadian films of 1998
 List of Canadian films of 1999

2000s
 List of Canadian films of 2000
 List of Canadian films of 2001
 List of Canadian films of 2002
 List of Canadian films of 2003
 List of Canadian films of 2004
 List of Canadian films of 2005
 List of Canadian films of 2006
 List of Canadian films of 2007
 List of Canadian films of 2008
 List of Canadian films of 2009

2010s
 List of Canadian films of 2010
 List of Canadian films of 2011
 List of Canadian films of 2012
 List of Canadian films of 2013
 List of Canadian films of 2014
 List of Canadian films of 2015
 List of Canadian films of 2016
 List of Canadian films of 2017
 List of Canadian films of 2018
 List of Canadian films of 2019

2020s
 List of Canadian films of 2020
 List of Canadian films of 2021
 List of Canadian films of 2022
 List of Canadian films of 2023

See also

 Top 10 Canadian Films of All Time
 List of Quebec films
 List of years in Canadian television
 List of Canadian submissions for the Academy Award for Best Foreign Language Film

References

Sources

External links
 Canadian film at the Internet Movie Database
 Canadian Film Online database (from Athabasca University)
 Canadian Feature Film Database (from Library and Archives Canada)